Nabilah Islam (born November 27, 1989) is an American activist and politician from the state of Georgia who is the Georgia State Senator-elect for the 7th district as a result of the 2022 Georgia State Senate election. She became the first Muslim woman in the Georgia State Senate and the second overall in the Georgia State Legislature along with Sheikh Rahman and Farooq Mughal. She previously ran to represent Georgia's 7th congressional district in 2020. Due to her progressive stances, she has been described as "Georgia's AOC" and "Atlanta's AOC."

Early life and education
Islam was born in the United States to parents from Bangladesh and grew up in Norcross and Lawrenceville. Her father worked as a file clerk at the Internal Revenue Service and her mother, originally from Noakhali, worked various low wage jobs, at one point as a burger fipper at Hardee's and in a warehouse. An insurance company tried to deny benefits for her mother after she took time off work due to a herniated disc, leading Islam to become an advocate for expanded healthcare.

Islam graduated from Central Gwinnett High School and Georgia State University with a BBA in marketing.

Career
Islam previously served as campaign manager for Atlanta City Councilmember Andre Dickens, President of the Gwinnett County Young Democrats, and on Hillary Clinton’s presidential campaign.

2020 congressional campaign

Islam ran in the Democratic primary for Georgia's 7th congressional district in 2020. She was endorsed by U.S. Representative Alexandria Ocasio-Cortez of New York, which helped cause the "Georgia's AOC" nickname. During the campaign, Islam supported Medicare for All and a $15 federal minimum wage. She placed third with 12.3% of the vote.

Islam struggled with paying rent, did not have healthcare, and put her student loan debt into forbearance during the campaign due to not being able to work full time. She filed a formal petition to the Federal Elections Commission to allow candidates to use campaign contributions for a minimum salary and health benefits. She charged that current regulations barred working class peope from running for office and the petition was supported by Campaign Legal Center, Common Cause, and Issue One.

2022 State Senate campaign
With the backing of U.S. Representative Lucy McBath, Islam entered the Democratic primary for the 7th district of the Georgia State Senate in 2022. The district, a new open seat, is entirely in Gwinnett County and leans towards Democrats. She was endorsed by Fair Fight Action, a voting rights organization founded by Georgia politician Stacey Abrams. She defeated State Representative Beth Moore in the primary with just over 50% of the vote and subsequently defeated Republican Josh McKay in the general election with roughly 53% of the vote.

Personal life 
Islam lives in Lawrenceville. She is Muslim.

Electoral history

References

External links 
 Campaign website

American people of Bangladeshi descent
Asian-American people in Georgia (U.S. state) politics
Living people
American Muslims
Georgia (U.S. state) Democrats
21st-century American politicians
1989 births